Immortal Grand Prix is an anime series co-produced simultaneously by Cartoon Network and Production I.G. The opening theme is "Go for It!" by GRAN RODEO while the ending theme is "Believe Yourself" by Exige. The ending theme for Toonami is "Strings" by Tommy Guerrero.

Episode list

Season 1 (2005–06)

Season 2 (2006)

References 

Immortal Grand Prix